X Factor is the Finnish version of X Factor, a show originating from the United Kingdom. It is a television music talent show contested by aspiring pop singers drawn from public auditions. The first season concluded in May 2010. On 13 June 2017, it was revealed that the show would be revived for a second season which began airing in 2018.

Judges' categories and their contestants
In each season, each judge is allocated a category to mentor and chooses three acts to progress to the live shows. This table shows, for each season, which category each judge was allocated and which acts he or she put through to the live shows.

Key:
 – Winning judge/category. Winners are in bold, eliminated contestants in small font.

Series summary
 Contestant in (or mentor of) "16–24s" category
 Contestant in (or mentor of) "Boys" category
 Contestant in (or mentor of) "Girls" category
 Contestant in (or mentor of) "Over 25s" category
 Contestant in (or mentor of) "Groups" category

Season 1 (2010)
The show's inaugural Finnish season was in 2010. It was broadcast on MTV3 television station and hosted by Heikki Paasonen with Jukka Rossi hosting the affiliated Xtra Factor. The three judges were Linda Brava (groups), Gugi Kokljuschkin (16- to 24-year-olds) and Renne Korppila (25 and over). And the finalists for each category were chosen by the judges on 28 March.

Auditions were held 24 January to 28 February 2010, and the camps on 7, 14 and 21 March. The nine finalists, three in each category (groups, 16- to 24-year-old, 25 and over) were chosen end of March 2010.

Guest performers
Guest performers included Anna Abreu, Anna Puu, Maija Vilkkumaa, Adam Lambert, Amy Macdonald and Paloma Faith.

Contestants

Key:
 – Winner
 – Runner-up
 – Third place

Live shows

Results table

Contestants' colour key:
{|
|-
| – Korppila's contestants (Over 25s)
|-
| – Kokljuschkin's contestants (16–24s)
|-
| – Brava's contestants (Groups)
|-
| – Bottom two
|-
|}

Season 2 (2018)

On 13 June 2017, it was announced that Michael Monroe, Saara Aalto, Suvi Teräsniska and Mikael Gabriel would judge the 2nd season. The hosts are Ile Uusivuori and Viivi Pumpanen.

Contestants

Key:
 – Winner
 – Runner-up
 – Third place

Live shows

Contestants' colour key:
{|
|-
| – Gabriel's contestants (Boys)
|-
| – Aalto's contestants (Girls)
|-
| – Teräsniska's contestants (Over 25s)
|-
| – Monroe's contestants (Groups)
|-
| – Contestant was in the bottom two and had to sing again in the final showdown
|-
| – Contestant received the fewest public votes and was immediately eliminated (no final showdown)
|-
| – Contestant received the most public votes
|-
|}

Live show details

Week 1 (15 April 2018)

Judges' votes to eliminate
 Gabriel: Fanny Falk
 Teräsniska: Viktorio Angelov
 Aalto: Viktorio Angelov
 Monroe: Viktorio Angelov

Week 2 (22 April 2018)

Judges' votes to eliminate
 Monroe: Raid Amiri
 Gabriel: 6G
 Teräsniska: 6G
 Aalto: 6G

Week 3: Semi-final (29 April 2018)

Week 4: Final (6 May 2018)

References

External links
 Official site
 

Finland
Finnish reality television series
Television series by Fremantle (company)
2010 Finnish television series debuts
2010s Finnish television series
2018 Finnish television series endings
Finnish television series based on British television series
MTV3 original programming
Finnish non-fiction television series